Pygmaeconus is a genus  of predatory sea snails, or cone snails, marine gastropod mollusks in the family Conidae.

Species
 Pygmaeconus micarius (Hedley, 1912)
 Pygmaeconus molaerivus (Dekkers, 2016)
 Pygmaeconus papalis (Weinkauff, 1875)
 Pygmaeconus traillii (A. Adams, 1855)
 Pygmaeconus visseri (Delsaerdt, 1990)
 Pygmaeconus wallacei (Lorenz & Morrison, 2004)

References

 Monnier E., Limpalaër L., Robin A. & Roux C. (2018). A taxonomic iconography of living Conidae. Harxheim: ConchBooks. 2 vols. 1205 pp.

External links
 Puillandre N. & Tenorio M.J. (2017). A question of rank: DNA sequences and radula characters reveal a new genus of cone snails (Gastropoda: Conidae). Journal of Molluscan Studies. 83(2): 200-210

 
Gastropod genera
Conidae